Pallamano L'Aquila is a handball team from city of L'Aquila currently plays in serie B group Marche-Abruzzo.

Story 
With more than 40 years of history, in the season 1980/81 played in the second league of Italian Championship
CUS Pallamano L'Aquila born by the fusion between il Cus pallamano L'Aquila e Handball Club L'Aquila in the 2002.
In the recent past (before the fu 2002/03 season) played in the Serie B missing promotion to A2 by a single point. The lack of economic resources has forced the company to a change in strategy, focusing resources exclusively on the youth sector.
In 2009, despite the difficulties caused by the L'Aquila earthquake, the team has achieved promotion from Serie C to B with 1st place

Current squad 2016–17

Goalkeeper
 31  Simone Fagioli
 81  Giuliano Rossi
Left Wingers
 1  Daniele Lozzi
 3  Pietro Forcella
 7  Andrea De Sanctis
 17  Francisco Espinosa Cotreras
Right Wingers 
 22  Mohammad Ahmad
 94  Gino De Meo
 99  Alessandro Liberati
Line player
 2  Domenico Tedeschini
 4  Piergiorgio Patrizii
 8  Luigi Fradiani
 21  Gianluca Nappo
 23  Gabriele Grimaldi

Left Backs
 17  Rafael Lacerda Vidal
 55  Pietro Colicchia
 69  Stefano Scotti
Central Backs
 10  Gino Pucci
 11  Gianmarco Blair
 63  Giuseppe Berti-De Marinis
Right Backs
 9  Luca Santucci

Rank History

External links 

Italian handball clubs
Organisations based in L'Aquila
Aquila